Seydişehir is a town and district of Konya Province in the Mediterranean region of Turkey. According to a 2000 census, the population of the district is 85,456 of which 48,372 live in the town of Seydişehir.

History
Seydişehir has an extensive historical record extending back many centuries. In 5500 BC, Seydişehir bordered the ancient province of Psidia  and some historical building may date to this era. The city is situated in a valley between Lake Trogitis and Lake Karalis.  Pre-historic buildings are preserved within the valley. Many artefacts from this era are housed in the Konya Archaeological Museum. In 2000–700 BC, the Hittite conquerors of middle Anatolia left their mark in the way of symbols and handiwork. Rock reliefs found in Seydişehir, believed to be made by the Hittite, support the idea of Hittite's living in the area.

Other
Seydişehir is famous for their roasted chickpeas. Seydişehir is also famous for Oil Wrestling.

Geography

Seydişehir is located south of  the Konya provincial center, and in the north of The Taurus Mountains.

Location

Prominent Persons
 Seyyid Harun Veli, Philosopher, Religious Scholar (13th century)
 İsmail Koç, Oil Wrestler, (d. 1989, Ankara, a. Seydişehir-Beyşehir)
 Mahmud Esad Efendi, Lawyer, writer and statesman (d. 1856, Seydişehir - ö. 1918, İstanbul)
 Sadi Irmak, Emeritus professor of medicine, politician, prime minister (d. 1904, Seydişehir - ö. 1990, İstanbul)
 Mustafa Üstündağ, Educator, politician, minister (d. 1933, Seydişehir - ö. 1983, Konya)

Notes

References

External links
 District municipality's official website 
 News of Seydisehir website 
 City Guide of Seydisehir website 

Populated places in Konya Province
Districts of Konya Province